The 2011 Mississippi gubernatorial election was held on November 8, 2011. Incumbent Republican Governor of Mississippi Haley Barbour was unable to run for a third term due to term limits.

Republican nominee Lieutenant Governor Phil Bryant defeated the Democratic nominee, Hattiesburg Mayor Johnny DuPree. Sworn in on January 10, 2012, Bryant became only the third Republican Governor of Mississippi since Reconstruction. This is the first election in which Republicans won three consecutive gubernatorial elections in the state.

Republican primary

Candidates
Phil Bryant, Lieutenant Governor of Mississippi
Dave Dennis, former New Orleans Federal Reserve Board Chairman
Ron Williams, businessman
Hudson Holliday, Pearl River County Supervisor
James Broadwater, businessman

Polling

Results

Democratic Primary

Candidates
Johnny DuPree, Hattiesburg Mayor
Bill Luckett, businessman and attorney
William Bond Compton, Jr., 2007 candidate for governor
Guy Dale Shaw

Results

Runoff results

General election

Predictions

Polling

Results

See also
United States elections, 2011

References

External links
Candidates (Archived)
 Phil Bryant
 Johnny Dupree
 Bobby Kearan
 Hudson Holliday
Information
Elections at the Mississippi Secretary of State
Statewide Sample Ballot
Mississippi gubernatorial election, 2011 at Ballotpedia
2011 Mississippi Governor Candidates at Project Vote Smart
Campaign contributions for 2011 Mississippi Governor from Follow the Money
Mississippi Governor 2011 from OurCampaigns.com

Gubernatorial
2011
Mississippi
November 2011 events in the United States